Mtwara Thermal Power Station is a power plant owned by the Tanzania Electric Supply Company. The station is not connected to the national grid but is instead connected to the Mtwara/Lindi mini-grid.

Location
Mikindani is about equidistant between Mtwara and the station. The coordinates of the station are 10°15'35.0"S, 40°02'19.0"E (Latitude:-10.259732; Longitude:40.038604).

History
The plant was first created by Wentworth Resources Limited in 2007 when Wentworth began building the Mnazi Bay gas fields. The company built a small  power plant to support their operations, with the surplus sold to the local community. Initially, the company posted a loss; however, by the end of 2011, they had managed to obtain their first profitable year. The company nevertheless decided to change its strategy within Tanzania and continue to focus their investment in gas exploration and drilling.

Wentworth Power Limited, the Wentworth subsidiary managing the operations, decided to sell all of its shares to the Tanzania Electric Supply Company for $13.5 million effective 7 February 2012. The gas supplied to the power plant, however, will still be supplied by Wentworth.

See also
List of power stations in Tanzania
Economy of Tanzania

References

External links
Website of Tanzania Electric Supply Company Limited
Website of Wentworth Resources Limited

Power stations in Tanzania